Ismaël Enzo Kanda (born 8 November 2000) is a French professional footballer who plays as a defender for Vitória. In his career, Kanda also played for the reserve squad of Lille, Entente Feignies Aulnoye and Gaz Metan Mediaș.

Club career

Early career
Kanda started his career in 2016 in the academy of Lille.

Feignies Aulnoye
In 2020, Kanda joined Championnat National 3 club Feignies Aulnoye.

Gaz Metan Mediaș
On 9 February 2021, Kanda joined Liga I club Gaz Metan Mediaș. On 23 January 2022, he made his debut when he came on as a 75th-minute substitute in a 1-0 victory against UTA Arad in the Liga I, replacing the scorer of the only goal of the match Vlad Morar.

Vitória
In July 2022, Kanda joined Liga 3 club Vitória.

References

External links
 

2000 births
Living people
Footballers from Lille
French footballers
Association football defenders
Championnat National 2 players
Championnat National 3 players
Lille OSC players
Entente Feignies Aulnoye FC players
Liga I players
CS Gaz Metan Mediaș players
Vitória F.C. players
Expatriate footballers in Romania
French expatriate sportspeople in Romania
Expatriate footballers in Portugal
French expatriate sportspeople in Portugal